The 1997 Tickford 500 was an endurance motor race for V8 Supercars. It was held on 14 September 1997 at the Sandown Raceway and was the 32nd running of the Sandown 500.

The race was won by Craig Lowndes and Greg Murphy, driving a Holden VS Commodore for the Holden Racing Team.

Qualifying
The fastest lap in qualifying was set by Mark Skaife at 1:11.3142.

Top 10 Shootout
The Top 10 Shootout, which was contested by the fastest ten cars from Qualifying, determined the order of the first ten grid positions for the race.

Official results

The race was started in the rain under the control of the safety car. The weather conditions resulted in a slower than expected average speed and the race did not run to its full 161 lap distance, being halted on lap 157 after 3 hours 45 minutes and 22.3508 seconds.

Statistics
 Pole position: Mark Skaife
 Fastest race lap: Mark Skaife – 1:17.4932 on lap 101
 Race time of winning car: 3h 45:22.3508

References

External links
 Official Supercars website
 Image of the winning car at i.pinimg.com, as archived at web.archive.org

Motorsport at Sandown
Tickford 500
Pre-Bathurst 500